Francis Zammit Dimech (born 23 October 1954) is a Maltese politician who served in domestic Maltese politics as a member of the House of Representatives of Malta between 1987 and 2017 and as a Member of the European Parliament from 2017 till 2019. During his tenure within Maltese politics, Zammit Dimech held office as Minister for Foreign Affairs in the government of Lawrence Gonzi from 28 November 2012, until the defeat of Gonzi's government in the 2013 Maltese general election. He previously held numerous other ministerial responsibilities including communications, infrastructure, tourism, culture, and environment. Before being appointed Foreign Affairs Minister he served as Chair of the Parliamentary Foreign Affairs Committee. Prior to entering politics, Francis Zammit Dimech worked as a lawyer and broadcaster.

Education
Francis Zammit Dimech attended the University of Malta, where he graduated in Law (LL.D) in 1979, and attained a master's degree in financial services in 1999. Zammit Dimech later went on to pursue another postgraduate degree in the United Kingdom and graduated in 2013 with an M.B.A degree from Henley Business School (University of Reading, UK). At present, he is reading for a PhD in Law of Broadcasting at the University of Malta.

Professional career
Zammit Dimech is a lawyer by profession specializing in international transactions, trust deeds, financial services, corporate services provision, commercial law, and migration. He has been the chairman of the Francis Zammit Dimech Associates law firm since 2009.

Zammit Dimech was involved in journalistic activities all throughout his life. He served as an editor for many Maltese newspaper and magazine sources; such as the Il-Poplu, and Zaghzugh monthly publications. In 1980, he acted as the parliamentary correspondent for The Times of Malta. Zammit Dimech is currently a lecturer of European media law, communication and broadcasting at his alma mater (The University of Malta). On the management front, Zammit Dimech lectured regularly at the Henley Business School on Reputation, Responsibility and Corporate Governance.

Political career
Francis Zammit Dimech began his political involvement at a very young age. In 1981 he was selected to be the vice-president of the Democrat Youth Community of Europe (DEMYC), which is the Federation of Christian Democrat and Conservative youth organizations of Europe. In this post, he was responsible to co-ordinate representation of DEMYC on the European Communities Youth Form bodies, and to promote training programs for youth political leaders and leaders of DEMYC member organizations. Prior to that, Zammit Dimech served as the president of the student council at the University of Malta.

On the national political front, Zammit Dimech was elected to the Parliament of Malta in 1987 and in all subsequent general elections, until 2017. He has held ministerial appointments for sixteen years between 1990 and 2013, including: 
 Minister for Transport and Communications
 Prior to serving as the Minister for Transport and Communications, he was the parliamentary secretary for Transport and Communications
 Minister for the Environment
 Minister for Resources and Infrastructure
 Minister for Tourism and Culture
 Minister for Foreign Affairs

Zammit Dimech's role in the Maltese national government was not limited to his ministerial appointments. Throughout his 30-year stint as member of the Parliament of Malta, Zammit Dimech also served as chairman of the Foreign and European Affairs Committee, in addition to being a member of the Maltese Parliamentary Delegation to the Parliamentary Assembly of the Council of Europe. From 2008 to 2010 he chaired the Legislation Committee in the Maltese national parliament. Prior to the EU accession, Zammit Dimech served as member of the EU-Malta joint Parliamentary Committee.

Zammit Dimech has been heavily involved in the Maltese Nationalist Party since serving as the President of the Youth Branch in 1985. Other positions that Mr. Zammit Dimech obtained in the National Party include, information secretary, and president of the Administrative Council. Additionally, he became a member of the Nationalist Party Executive Committee, in 1987.

Zammit Dimech served briefly as a Member of the European Parliament from  2017 till 2019. During this period, Zammit Dimech served as the EPP Group rapporteur on media pluralism and freedom. He is serving on the following parliamentary committees and delegations:

Publications
 Poll of '76  (Published in 1980)
 The Untruth Game – Broadcasting Under Labour (Published in 1986)
 Eddie – The People's Choice (published in 1987)

References

Living people
1954 births
Government ministers of Malta
Maltese broadcasters
20th-century Maltese lawyers
Members of the House of Representatives of Malta
Nationalist Party (Malta) politicians
Nationalist Party (Malta) MEPs
People from St. Julian's, Malta
MEPs for Malta 2014–2019
Foreign ministers of Malta
Alumni of the University of Reading
University of Malta alumni
20th-century Maltese politicians
21st-century Maltese politicians
21st-century Maltese lawyers